Yuppies is a 1986 Italian comedy film directed by Carlo Vanzina.

A sequel entitled Yuppies 2, directed by Enrico Oldoini, was released later in the same year.

Cast
Jerry Calà as Giacomo
Christian De Sica as Sandro
Massimo Boldi as Lorenzo
Ezio Greggio as Willy
Corinne Cléry as Françoise
Federica Moro as Margherita
Guido Nicheli as director of Giacomo
Ugo Bologna as Lorenzo's father in law
Valeria D'Obici as Virginia
Sharon Gusberti as Amanda
Isaac George as waiter of Lorenzo
Jinny Steffan as Gioietta
Sergio Vastano as Police commissioner
Renzo Marignano as Françoise's husband

References

External links

1986 films
Films directed by Carlo Vanzina
Films scored by Detto Mariano
1980s Italian-language films
1986 comedy films
Italian comedy films
1980s Italian films